The Đurđevi Stupovi Monastery (lit. "Monastery of the Pillars of St. George") is a Serbian Orthodox monastery near the town of Berane, in northeastern Montenegro. It was founded by Stefan Prvoslav, the nephew of Stefan Nemanja, in 1213. Since 2019, it was the cathedral monastery of the Eparchy of Budimlja, until the end of the 17th century. Today, it is the cathedral monastery of the Serbian Orthodox Eparchy of Budimlje-Nikšić in Montenegro.

See also 
 Eparchy of Budimlje-Nikšić
 List of Serbian Orthodox monasteries
 Metropolitanate of Montenegro and the Littoral

References

Sources

External links 
 Official page
 Pictures of the monastery

13th-century Serbian Orthodox church buildings
Serbian Orthodox monasteries in Montenegro
Medieval Serbian Orthodox monasteries
Berane
Religious organizations established in the 1210s
1213 establishments in Europe
Nemanjić dynasty endowments
Medieval Montenegro